Sir Alexander Stuart  (21 March 1824 – 16 June 1886) was Premier of New South Wales from 5 January 1883 to 7 October 1885.

Early years
Stuart was born at Edinburgh, the son of Alexander Stuart and his wife Mary, née McKnight. Stuart was educated at the Edinburgh Academy and attended the University of Edinburgh, but did not graduate. On leaving school Stuart worked in merchant's office at Leith and at Glasgow. Then Stuart worked as manager of the North of Ireland Linen Mills. In 1845 Stuart worked for the mercantile and banking house Carr, Tagore and Company in Calcutta, India. Finding that the climate did not suit him, Stuart went to New Zealand in 1850.

Australia
On 9 October 1851 Stuart arrived in Sydney aboard the Scotia. The Victorian gold discoveries tempted him to try his fortune on the diggings at Ballarat and Bendigo, but he was not successful.

Stuart returned to Sydney in 1852 and joined the Bank of New South Wales as assistant secretary, in 1853 he was assistant inspector. In 1854 Stuart had become secretary and inspector of branches with a salary of £1200. On 10 November 1853 Suart married Christiana Eliza Wood. In 1854 Stuart investigated the embezzlement of funds from the bank's Ballarat branch by its manager, George D. Lang, son of John Dunmore Lang, who was convicted and sentenced to five years hard labour as a result. John Dunmore Lang published an attack on Stuart and the bank, The Convicts' Bank; or a Plain Statement of the Case of Alleged Embezzlement, and as a result Lang was charged and convicted of criminal libel and served six months in prison. In 1855 Stuart accepted a partnership in R. Towns and Company, merchants, and became well known as a business man in Sydney.

Political career
Stuart was active as a vocal lay member of the Sydney Anglican synods from 1866 and a member of the standing committee of the Sydney Diocesan Committee and Educational and Book Society. In the 1870s, during a controversy on the education question, Stuart spoke in favour of denominational schools and was asked by Bishop Frederic Barker to stand for parliament in 1874. The same year Stuart was elected a member of the Legislative Assembly for East Sydney on a platform of support for the 1866 Public Schools Act, the 'rapid extension' of railways and aid to municipalities.

On 8 February 1876 Stuart succeeded William Forster as colonial treasurer in the third ministry led by Sir John Robertson, and held the position until Robertson was defeated in March 1877. Stuart resigned his seat in November 1879 to become agent-general at London but gave up this appointment in April 1880 in order to fend off bankruptcy without having left Sydney. Stuart was returned for Illawarra at the general election in 1880 and became leader of the opposition. In 1882 the Parkes-Robertson ministry was defeated and Stuart became Premier from 5 January 1883 to 6 October 1885. Stuart succeeded in passing a land act in 1884 after much opposition, and other acts dealt with the civil service, fire brigades, the university, and licensing.

Stuart was under constant attack in parliament during 1884 over his ownership of mineral lands in the Illawarra. In October 1884 Stuart had a paralytic stroke and went to Napier, New Zealand to recuperate at the house of his brother, the Bishop of Waiapu. It was during his illness that W. B. Dalley as Acting-Premier offered to send a contingent to the Sudan. Stuart resigned in October 1885 and was nominated to a seat in the Legislative Council. In 1886 Stuart was appointed executive commissioner to the Colonial and Indian exhibition at London, but died there of typhoid, survived by his wife, son and probably one of his three daughters.

Stuart was a man of probity, with a high reputation in financial circles. According to the Sydney Morning Herald, "He was slow in making up his mind, and there was a want of resolute firmness … but … he had a good deal of the dogged determination that belongs to the Scotch character, and a large capacity for patient endurance … He was very friendly … but he lacked that magnetic power which great leaders have of fascinating their comrades, and of binding them as it were by hooks of steel."

Honours

Stuart was created a Knight Commander of the Order of St Michael and St George (KCMG) in 1885.

References

 

Premiers of New South Wales
Knights Commander of the Order of St Michael and St George
Members of the New South Wales Legislative Assembly
Members of the New South Wales Legislative Council
1824 births
Colonial Secretaries of New South Wales
1886 deaths
Australian people of Scottish descent
Treasurers of New South Wales
19th-century Australian politicians
Agents-General for New South Wales